S. Muthukrishnan was an Indian politician and former Member of the Legislative Assembly. He was elected to the Tamil Nadu legislative assembly as an Anna Dravida Munnetra Kazhagam candidate from Kanyakumari constituency in Kanyakumari district in 1980 election.

References 

People from Kanyakumari district
All India Anna Dravida Munnetra Kazhagam politicians
Living people
Year of birth missing (living people)